Nina Margarita Conti (born 25 August 1973) is a British actress, comedian, and ventriloquist.

Early life 
Conti was born and raised in Hampstead, London, the daughter of actors Tom Conti and Kara Wilson. She attended King Alfred School, London, and graduated with a first class honours degree in philosophy from the University of East Anglia in 1995. She trained with Ken Campbell.

Acting 
Conti has worked as an actress since 1996. She appeared in several roles in Daisy and Ken Campbell's 1999 and 2000 productions of The Warp, Neil Oram's 24-hour play cycle, and was a member of the RSC's 2000/01 company in Stratford and London. Ken Campbell subsequently devised the ventriloquist play Let Me Out!!! for her, which she took to the 2001 Edinburgh Festival Fringe. She appeared as half-Afghan camera operator Azadine in Henry Naylor's play Finding Bin Laden at the 2003 Edinburgh Festival Fringe. In 2005, Conti voiced Latrina in the animated comedy series Bromwell High.

Conti has appeared in several television shows, including Black Books, Holby City, Single, and the Australian panel show Spicks and Specks. Her radio performances include characters in Radio 4 comedy Clare in the Community.

Conti and Monkey portrayed a morning weather team on the fictional "Wake Up L.A." in Christopher Guest's 2006 film, For Your Consideration.

Conti was awarded joint "Best Performance" in the Maverick Movie Awards for Her Master's Voice, a 2012 film.

In 2013, she portrayed the part of Bea Chadwick in Christopher Guest's HBO mockumentary Family Tree.

Stand-up comedy 
In 2002, Conti won the BBC New Comedy Awards, came second in the Hackney Empire New Act of the Year and came third in "Laughing Horse New Act of the Year" competitions.

Conti regularly headlines at London comedy venues and has appeared at The Comedy Store.

She took her first solo full-length show, Complete and Utter Conti, to the Edinburgh Festival Fringe in 2007, where she introduced some new characters as well as performing familiar routines. In 2008 she won the Barry Award for this show at the Melbourne International Comedy Festival, tying with Kristen Schaal.

At the Melbourne Comedy Festival 2010 she debuted a new puppet, an elderly woman who is her "Granny". Conti and Granny appeared in episode six of the ninth series of the BBC comedy quiz show QI in 2011.  On that episode, Conti noted that she inherited the Granny puppet from Ken Campbell on Campbell's death.

In 2012, Conti appeared in Russell Howard's Good News with Granny. She also used a mask on an audience member to persuade him to dance.  On the series 8 premiere of Live at the Apollo, Conti expanded the act to provide voices for two audience members in masks.

In March 2013, Conti appeared on Let's Dance for Comic Relief with Monk. She danced to "I Like to Move It" by Reel 2 Real.

In June 2013, Conti appeared on Channel 4's Comedy Gala.

Conti appeared as a guest host on the final episode of the ninth series of the BBC stand-up comedy programme,  Live at the Apollo, performing her act with Monkey and an additional dummy-mask routine.

In October 2014, Conti appeared on Channel 4's The Feeling Nuts Comedy Night raising awareness of testicular cancer.

In 2015, Nina appeared on BBC Four's Clowning Around, where she trained to be a giggle doctor and clown, and performed to children in hospitals.

In May 2015, Nina appeared on 8 Out of 10 Cats Does Countdown in Dictionary Corner and used Fabio, the show's regular prop guy, as a dummy.

Radio 
Conti's radio work includes Clare in the Community, Sneakiepeeks and guesting on Parsons and Naylor's Pull-Out Sections.

Television 
Conti's television work began in 2002 with parts in Black Books and Holby City.

In 2003 she starred as Mary in a series called Single, then in 2005 voiced characters in another series entitled Bromwell High.  She played a part in Blunder, The Golf War and featured in Comedy Cuts in 2006, 2007 and 2008 respectively.

In 2013 Conti, along with her puppet Monkey, played a feature role in Family Tree as Bea Chadwick.

Conti has appeared on Pointless Celebrities twice: 10 November 2018 with Sally Phillips and 30 October 2021 partnering Tim Vine.

Filmography
Conti has appeared in a number of diverse forms of media including films, television shows, and shorts, listed below.

Characters

Monkey
Monkey is a cynical monkey who is continually insulting Conti and swearing when he does not have his demands fulfilled. He often deconstructs ventriloquism by pointing out that he has no microphone, or that all of his ideas are Conti's, and calls it a "dead art". He sometimes shows irritation towards performing on stage and makes Conti laugh at his words.

Granny
Granny is an elderly Scotswoman to whom Conti refers as someone who is a lot like her own grandmother. Granny often chides Conti for the simplest things Conti has done; for instance, when Conti reveals she has two legs, Granny responds by saying "Oh, two legs? You're spoiling me!" Her main act is to telepathically guess numbers or words, which she always guesses correctly. She also talks about her dead husband, Frank. Granny refers to people with words like "dear", "child" or "my daughter". The original prop was donated to Vent Haven Museum in July 2009, in memory of Ken Campbell, from whom Conti received her, but Conti had a replica made which she continues to use in her acts.

Face mask
The face mask, rather than an actual puppet with a personality, is a mask that covers the lower half of an audience participant's face and can be manipulated by a hand-piece held by Conti to make it look like the participant is talking. Conti often uses this to put the participant in awkward and embarrassing situations, such as making them say that they want nothing more than to dance in front of the audience, while their body language suggests the opposite.

Personal life
Conti was in a relationship with the comedian and actor Ken Campbell, from whom she inherited his collection of ventriloquist dummies after he died. She has two sons from her marriage with fellow comedian Andrew "Stan" Stanley, from whom she is separated.

References

External links 

1973 births
Living people
People educated at King Alfred School, London
Alumni of the University of East Anglia
English people of Irish descent
English people of Italian descent
English people of Scottish descent
English stand-up comedians
English stage actresses
English radio actresses
English television actresses
People from Hampstead
Ventriloquists
English women comedians
Anglo-Scots
Royal Shakespeare Company members
20th-century English comedians
21st-century English comedians